Spearville Township is a township in Ford County, Kansas, United States.  As of the 2000 census, its population was 1,150.

Geography
According to the USGS, it contains two cemeteries: Saint Johns and Silent Land.

Transportation
Spearville Township contains two airports or landing strips: Knoeber Landing Strip and Shehan Airpark.

References
 USGS Geographic Names Information System (GNIS)

External links
 US-Counties.com
 City-Data.com

Townships in Ford County, Kansas
Townships in Kansas